Kleinschmidt Inc. was established in 1931 by Edward Kleinschmidt. It is a privately owned firm that provides electronic commerce, electronic data interchange, and value-added network services. Its headquarters are in Deerfield, Illinois.

Edward Kleinschmidt was one of the inventors of the teleprinter, one of the first electronic commerce devices.

History

1893 - Edward Ernst Kleinschmidt started working with telegraphy;
1898 - Edward E Kleinschmidt opened his own experimental shop;
1906 - George Seely joined Kleinschmidt’s shop with a partially developed block system for electric trolley car railways;
1910 - Exhibited at the Association of American Railroads Communications Convention;
1910 - Kleinschmidt started to receive multiple patents;
1914 - Kleinschmidt Electric Company was founded;
1924 - Kleinschmidt Electric merged with the Morkrum Company to form Morkrum-Kleinschmidt Corporation;
1928 - The company name was changed to Teletype Corporation;
1930 - The Teletype Corporation was sold to AT&T for $30,000,000 in stock;
1931 - Kleinschmidt Laboratories Inc. was founded;
1944 - Edward E. Kleinschmidt demonstrated his lightweight teleprinter at the Chief Signal Officer;
1949 - The Kleinschmidt 100-words-per-minute typebar page printer was made the standard for the Military;
1956 - Kleinschmidt Laboratories Inc. merged with Smith Corona which merged with Marchant Calculating Machine Company shortly thereafter, forming SCM;
1979 - Started to provide Electronic Data Interchange (EDI) and Car Location Message (CLM) services;
1986 - Hanson Trust acquired SCM Corporation. Harry S. Gaples, then Kleinschmidt division president, purchased the division from Hanson Trust.

See also

 Edward Kleinschmidt
 Electronic commerce
 Electronic Data Interchange
 Enterprise Application Integration
 Supply Chain Management
Teletypewriter
 Value-added network

References

External links 
 

Companies based in Deerfield, Illinois
Networking companies